Hollywood Darlings is an American comedy series starring Beverley Mitchell, Jodie Sweetin, and Christine Lakin that premiered on April 12, 2017 on Pop. On September 18, 2017, the show was renewed for a second season after it became the network’s number 1 original series debut ever among women 18–34 according to Nielsen. The second season premiered on April 18, 2018.

Premise 
The series is an improv comedy-series which follows three lifelong friends who grew up together in "the business," became household names, and now take on even bigger roles as moms, wives, and businesswomen. They play exaggerated versions of themselves.

Cast

Main 
 Beverley Mitchell as herself
 Jodie Sweetin as herself
 Christine Lakin as herself

Recurring 
 Brandon Breaul as himself, Christine's husband
 Soleil Moon Frye as herself
 Tony Rodriguez as Tony

Guest stars 
 Andrea Barber as herself ("How Christine Got Her Groove Back")
 Andrew Keegan as himself ("How Christine Got Her Groove Back")
 Wanya Morris as himself ("Driving Miss Jodie")
 Tamera Mowry as herself ("Driving Miss Jodie")
 DeAnna Pappas as herself ("Got Milk?")
 Jaleel White as himself ("Got Milk?")
 Heather Tom as herself ("The Bev Witch Project")
 Nicholle Tom as herself ("The Bev Witch Project")
 Lance Bass as himself ("The Luke Perry Incident")
 Patrick Duffy as himself ("The Luke Perry Incident")
 Staci Keanan as herself ("The Luke Perry Incident")
 Lori Beth Denberg as herself ("She's Not All That")
 Will Friedle as himself ("Y2K")
 Marla Sokoloff as herself ("Y2K")
 Matthew Lawrence as himself ("Star Crossed Mothers")
 David Lascher as himself ("Dry Spell")
 Tatyana Ali as herself ("White Little Lies")

Episodes

Series overview

Season 1 (2017)
<onlyinclude>

Season 2 (2018)
<onlyinclude>

Ratings

Season 1 (2017)

Season 2 (2018)

Trivia 

 The show started in season 1 out as a mockumentary style comedy, with the characters giving commentary during the scenes. Season 2 is a bit more stylized.

References

External links 
 Official Site
 

2010s American comedy television series
2017 American television series debuts
2018 American television series endings
Television shows set in Los Angeles
English-language television shows
Television series by All3Media
Pop (American TV channel) original programming